Khush Nameh (also Romanized as Khūsh Nāmeh and Khvoshnāmeh; also known as Khoshnama) is a village in Khvoresh Rostam-e Shomali Rural District, Khvoresh Rostam District, Khalkhal County, Ardabil Province, Iran. At the 2006 census, its population was 68, in 15 families.

References 

Tageo

Towns and villages in Khalkhal County